NGC 6566 is a compact elliptical galaxy within the constellation Draco. It is located about 250 million light-years (80 Mpc) away from the Sun. It was discovered on October 27, 1861 by the astronomer Heinrich d'Arrest.

References

External links
 NED NGC 6566

Lenticular galaxies
6566
Draco (constellation)